New Richmond High School (NRHS) is a public high school in New Richmond, Ohio, United States. It is part of the New Richmond Exempted Village School District.

Notable alumni 
 Todd Benzinger, MLB player
 Dwayne Woodruff, judge and former NFL player

References

External links 
 

High schools in Clermont County, Ohio
Public high schools in Ohio